Bob Blackman (born 1956) is a British Conservative politician.

Bob Blackman may also refer to:

 Bob Blackman (American football) (1918–2000)
 Robert Blackman (born 1943), American costume designer
 Robert R. Blackman Jr. (born 1948), United States Marine Corps general